Alabama Landing is an unincorporated community in Union Parish, Louisiana, United States.

History
Alabama Landing was founded by settlers from Alabama near a landing on the Ouachita River.

References

Unincorporated communities in Union Parish, Louisiana
Unincorporated communities in Louisiana
Unincorporated communities in Monroe, Louisiana metropolitan area